Natalia Nogulich (born October 1, 1950) is an American film, television actress and author.

Nogulich was born Natalija Nogulich in Chicago, Illinois, of Serbian descent.  Her best-known appearances have been on Star Trek: The Next Generation and Star Trek: Deep Space Nine as Vice Admiral/Fleet Admiral Alynna Nechayev.

She portrayed Josephine Hoffa in the film Hoffa and provided the voice for Mon Mothma for the radio adaptation of Return of the Jedi.

Selected filmography
 
 Stony Island (1978) as Mr. Moss' Honey
 Lou Grant (1980, TV Series) as Pat
 Four Friends (1981) as Vera
 Vamping (1984) as Julie
 Designing Women (1986, TV Series) as Professor Primrose 'Primmie' Horton
 Simon & Simon (1987, TV Series) as Sonia
 Dynasty (1987, TV Series) as April
 Sister, Sister (1987) as Fran Steuben
 Cagney & Lacey (1987, TV Series) as Louise Poe
 The Dirty Dozen: The Fatal Mission (1988, TV Movie) as Yelena Petrovic
 Things Change (1988) as Anna
 Matlock (1988–1991, TV Series) as Dr. Barbara Reilkin / Marjorie Manners
 Dirty Dancing (1989, TV Series)
 Coach (1989, TV Series) as Madame Roola
 National Lampoon's Christmas Vacation (1989) as Mrs. Shirley
 Tales from the Crypt (1990, TV Series) as Madame Vorna
 The Guardian (1990) as Molly Sheridan
 Postcards from the Edge (1990) as Friend at Airport
 L.A. Law (1990–1994, TV Series) as Lorraine Korshak / Helen Keris
 Father Dowling Mysteries (1991, TV Series) as Mrs. Hudson
 The Boys (1991, TV Movie) as Denise
 Homicide (1991) as Chava
 Brooklyn Bridge (1991–1992, TV Series) as Aunt Miriam
 The Water Engine (1992, TV Movie) as Soapbox Speaker Two
 Freshman Dorm (1992, TV Series) as Mrs. Beckenstein
 Hoffa (1992) as Jo Hoffa
 The Prom (1992) as Healer
 Civil Wars (1992–1993, TV Series) as Lorraine Wofford
 Star Trek: The Next Generation (1992–1994, TV Series) as Admiral Alynna Nechayev
 Murder, She Wrote (1992–1995, TV Series) as Denise Naveau / Marika Valenti
 Picket Fences (1992–1995, TV Series) as Louise Talbot
 It's Nothing Personal (1993, TV Movie)
 Blood In Blood Out (1993) as Janis
 Moon Over Miami (1993, TV Series) as Kate
 The Chase (1994) as Frances Voss
 Children of the Dark (1994, TV Movie) as Stanja Janecek
 Confessions of a Sorority Girl (1994, TV Movie) as Mrs. Masterson
 The Glass Shield (1994) as Judge Helen Lewis
 Star Trek: Deep Space Nine (1994, TV Series) as Admiral Alynna Nechayev
 Above Suspicion (1995) as Def. Atty. Wallace
 Steal Big Steal Little (1995) as Alice
 NewsRadio (1995, TV Series) as Melanie Sanders
 Ned and Stacey (1995, TV Series) as Bernadette Macdowel
 Eye for an Eye (1996) as Susan Juke
 Murder One (1996, TV Series) as Martina Spector
 After Jimmy (1996, TV Movie) as Lydia
 Dark Skies (1996, TV Series) as Dr. Helen Gould
 The Shot (1996) as Theatre Director
 The Lazarus Man (1996, TV Series) as Joie DeWinter
 The Pretender (1996–1999, TV Series) as Susan Granger
 The Sleepwalker Killing (1997, TV Movie) as Atty. Brooke McAdam
 The Practice (1997, TV Series) as Judge Stevens
 Tracey Takes On... (1997–1999, TV Series) as Paige
 Prey (1998, TV Series) as Dr. Ann Coulter
 Jenny (1998, TV Series) as Sophia
 The Get (1998) as Mother
 Frasier (1998, TV Series) as Susan Kendall
 Home Improvement (1998, TV Series) as Agatha
 Caroline in the City (1998, TV Series) as Ms. Kaye 'Kitty' Reynaldo
 Restraining Order (1999) as Judge Hargreaves
 Chicago Hope (1999, TV Series) as Principal
 Ryan Caulfield: Year One (1999, TV Series)
 Grown Ups (1999, TV Series) as The Director
 Days of Our Lives (2001, TV Series) as Ingrid Mitchell
 Nikki (2002, TV Series) as Frances
 Sabrina, the Teenage Witch (2002, TV Series) as Geri, Josh's Mother
 Ally McBeal (2002, TV Series) as Melissa Bloom
 Charmed (2002, TV Series) as Evil Witch
 For the People (2002, TV Series) as Dr. MacDougal
 Without a Trace (2003, TV Series) as Rosalind Kandell
 Frankie and Johnny Are Married (2003) as Theater Patron
 It's All Relative (2004, TV Series)
 JAG (2004, TV Series) as Diamond Saleswoman
 Spartan (2004) as Nadya
 The Division (2004, TV Series) as Jean Morrison
 Crossing Jordan (2004, TV Series) as Mrs. Novotna
 The Hollow (2004, TV Movie) as Nancy Worthen
 Medical Investigation (2004, TV Series) as Dahlia
 The West Wing (2004, TV Series) as Israeli Ambassador Shira Galit
 Huff (2004, TV Series) as Dr. Ann Brunner
 The Closer (2005, TV Series) as Kingsley's Lawyer
 Pizza My Heart (2005, TV Movie) as Mary Prestolani
 Nip/Tuck (2005, TV Series) as Shirley
 Bones (2006, TV Series) as Ivana Bardu
 So NoTORIous (2006, TV Series) as Touca
 The Unit (2006, TV Series) as Evelyn
 Immigrants (2008) (English version, voice)
 I Melt with You (2011) as Patient
 Hot in Cleveland (2011, TV Series) as Vadoma
 Sharkskin (2015) as Rose
 K.C. Undercover (2015, TV series) as Mrs. Vandervoort (credited as "Natalija Nogulich")
 Incarnate (2016) as Maggie (in the Car)
 The Last Word (2017) as Middle Aged Woman
 Caretakers (2019) as The Ambassador's Wife (Alana)
 Fuller House (2018–2020, TV series) as Berta

External links
 Natalija Nogulich's Official website
 Natalija Nogulich's Novel One woman's war Published 2012
 
 
 

1950 births
Actresses from Chicago
American film actresses
American people of Serbian descent
American stage actresses
American television actresses
Lake Forest College alumni
Living people
20th-century American actresses
21st-century American actresses